

Lake Biel or Lake Bienne is a lake in western Switzerland. Together with Lake Morat and Lake Neuchâtel, it is one of the three large lakes in the Jura region of Switzerland. It lies approximately at the language boundary between German and French speaking areas.

Geography 
The lake is 15 km long and up to 4.1 km wide. Its surface area is 39.3 km², the maximum depth 74 m. The lake is located at 429 metres above sea level.

Lake Biel/Bienne has a catchment area of about 8,305 km². Water remains in the lake for an average of 58 days. The rivers Aare and Zihl/Thielle flowing from Lake Neuchâtel, the Twannbach draining water down from the surplombing first Jura mountain range and the Suze draining water down from the Vallon de St. Imier, are the main tributaries. The Aare was redirected into the lake in 1878, in order to prevent the flooding of the nearby area called "Seeland", and drains the water out of the lake down to Büren through a simultaneously man-made channel. The level of all three lakes is being controlled by a dam built across the channel, in Port.

The largest settlement along the shores of Lake Biel are the bilingual city of Biel/Bienne and its sister city Nidau, both located on the northern end. The St. Peter's Island attracts tourists. The island is located near Erlach/Cerlier. Jean-Jacques Rousseau once spent a few months on the island.

One of the main business in the area is the watch and affiliated microtechnic industries. World famous watch brands have their sites and headquarters in the area, including the Swatch Group and Rolex movements manufacture.

The lake's surface is the lowest point of the canton of Neuchâtel.

Towns and villages by the lake 

As the lake is located on the border of the French and German language regions, most places have names in both languages, though not all versions are still in use.

Alfermée
Bipschal - Bévesier
Erlach - Cerlier
Gaicht - Jugy
Gerolfingen
Hagneck
Im Rusel
Ipsach
Le Landeron (canton of Neuchâtel) - Landern
Ligerz - Gléresse
Lüscherz - Locras
Mörigen - Morenges
Neuenstadt - La Neuveville
Nidau
Sankt-Petersinsel
Schafis - Chavanne
Schernelz - Cernaux
Sutz-Lattrigen
Täuffelen - Choufaille
Tüscherz - Daucher
Twann - Douanne
Vinelz - Fénil
Vingelz - Vigneules
Wingreis - Vingras

External links

Waterlevels of Lake Bienne at Ligerz
Tourism Biel/Bienne Seeland
 

 
Biel
Biel
Biel
LBiel
Bern–Neuchâtel border